The Volodymyr Saldo Bloc (abbr. БВС or BVS) was a minor regionalist political party in the Kherson Oblast in Ukraine headed by Volodymyr Saldo. The party was founded in 2019 and won 5 seats in the Kherson Oblast Council in the 2020 local elections, while Saldo finished second in the mayoral election.

Following their opposition to Saldo's activities in Russian-occupied Kherson in 2022, deputies of the Saldo Bloc announced that they would be serving in the "Support to the programs of the President of Ukraine" faction. On 20 March 2022, the party's activities were suspended by the National Security and Defense Council for the period of martial law due to allegations of having ties to Russia made by the Council. The chair of the party at the time was Iryna Khrunyk. On 14 June 2022 the Eighth Administrative Court of Appeal banned the activities of the party.

References

2019 establishments in Ukraine
2022 disestablishments in Ukraine
Banned political parties in Ukraine
Defunct political parties in Ukraine
Political parties disestablished in 2022
Political parties established in 2019
Russian political parties in Ukraine